Lahore Division is an administrative division of Punjab Province, Pakistan. It comprises four Districts - Kasur, Lahore, Nankana Sahib and Sheikhupura. The Lahore Division is commanded by a Commissioner to manage the division. Under the Commissioner there are four Additional Commissioners. For each district there is a Deputy Commissioner. Under the reforms of 2000, this tier of government was abolished, but in 2008 divisions were restored.

History
Lahore Division was originally an administrative division of the Punjab Province of British India. It extended along the right bank of the Sutlej River from the Himalaya to Multan, and comprised the six districts of Sialkot, Gujranwala, Lahore, Amritsar, Gurdaspur and Gujrat. The commissioner for the division also exercised political control over the hill state of Chamba.
 
The Commissioner's headquarters were at Lahore and Dalhousie.The total population of the Division increased from 4,696,636 in 1881 to 5,321,535 in 1891, and 5,598,463 in 1901. In 1901 Muslims numbered 3,332,175, or 60 percent of the total; while other religions included Hindus, 1,567,402; Sikhs, 661,320; Jains, 5,5,07; Buddhists, 6; Parsis, 228; and Christians, 31,815, of whom 25,248 were natives.

The division contained six districts:

Gurdaspur included a few square miles of mountainous country, enclosing the hill station of Dalhousie (highest, point, 7,687 feet) ; but otherwise the Division was flat. It contained 9,869 villages and 41 towns, of which the largest are Lahore (population, 202,964, including cantonment), Amristar(162,429), Sialkot (57,956), Gujranwala (29,224), Batala (27,365), and Gujrat (22,022). In commercial importance Lahore and Amritsar dwarfed all other towns in the Division, but Sialkot and Batala were considerably more than local centres.

Districts
Lahore division consists of following districts:

Independence
With the independence of India and Pakistan in 1947, Lahore Division was divided among the two countries. with the eastern half becoming Amritsar District.

See also 
 Divisions of Pakistan
 Divisions of Punjab, Pakistan

References

Divisions of Punjab, Pakistan
Divisions of British India
Lahore